Hamaguchi Osachi (Shinjitai: , also Hamaguchi Yūkō, 1 April 1870 – 26 August 1931) was a Japanese politician, cabinet minister and Prime Minister of Japan from 1929 to 1931. Nicknamed the  due to his dignified demeanor and mane-like hair, Hamaguchi served as leading member of the liberal Rikken Minseitō (Constitutional Democratic Party) during the "Taishō democracy" of interwar Japan; he initially survived an assassination attempt by a right-wing extremist in 1930, but died about nine months later from a bacterial infection in his unhealed wounds.

Early life and career
Hamaguchi was born in Nagaoka District, Tosa Province (now part of Kōchi city, Kōchi Prefecture on the island of Shikoku). He was the third son of Minaguchi Tanehira, an official in the local forestry department, and took the Hamaguchi name on his marriage to Hamaguchi Natsuko in 1889. Hamaguchi graduated from the Law College of Tokyo Imperial University in 1895 and began his career as a bureaucrat in the Ministry of Finance. In 1907, he rose to the position of Director of the Monopoly Bureau. He became Vice Communications Minister in 1912 and Vice Finance Minister in 1914.

Political career

Hamaguchi joined the Rikken Dōshikai political party led by Katō Takaaki in 1915, which became the Kenseikai in 1916. Hamaguchi was elected to the lower house in the Japanese Diet in 1915 from the Kōchi Second District, and was to hold onto this seat until his death in 1931.

In June 1924, Hamaguchi served as Finance Minister under the first Katō administration, holding the same portfolio under the 1st Wakatsuki administration from January to June 1926. As Finance Minister, he pursued fiscal retrenchment, and proposed reducing government spending by 17 percent and laying off tens of thousands of government workers; however, his policies had to be scaled considerably back due to strenuous opposition from government bureaucrats.

Hamaguchi was subsequently Home Minister in the Wakatsuki cabinet from June 1926 to April 1927. In a continuation of his efforts while as Finance Minister, Hamaguchi promoted a moral campaign through sponsorship of movies which emphasized thrift and reduced public consumption, with the goal of helping reduce Japan's trade deficit.

In 1927, Hamaguchi became the chairman of the new Rikken Minseitō political party formed by the merger of the Kenseikai and the Seiyūhontō.

The 1st Hamaguchi administration 

After the collapse of the administration of Tanaka Giichi in June 1929, Hamaguchi was selected to become Prime Minister of Japan and formed a cabinet based largely on Minseitō party members, which supported domestic economic reforms over overseas military adventurism. With a strong sense of his own rectitude and a tough, stubborn temperament, Hamaguchi inspired trust, promising that he was "ready to die if necessary" for the good of the country during his inaugural speech and promising an administration free of corruption.

Hamaguchi's primary concern was the Japanese economy, which had been in an ever-increasing recession since the end of World War I, and had been greatly weakened by the devastation caused by the 1923 Great Kantō earthquake. Hamaguchi promoted retrenchment, deflation and the rationalization of industry. The 1929 Great Depression, starting soon after he took office, put further pressure on the economy.

Initial public confidence and strong support from Emperor Hirohito and his entourage, including the genrō Saionji Kinmochi allowed Hamaguchi to implement fiscal austerity measures, which included ratification of the London Naval Treaty of 1930, which curtailed military spending. However, his measures to help stimulate exports, such as maintaining the Japanese yen on the gold standard, proved disastrous.

The failure of Hamaguchi's economic policies played into the hands of right-wing elements, already enraged by the government's conciliatory foreign policies and Japan's increasing unemployment problems. The opposition Rikken Seiyūkai joined forces with the vocal anti-Treaty faction within the Imperial Japanese Navy to accuse Hamaguchi of infringing of the military's "right of supreme command" as guaranteed under the Meiji Constitution.

Hamaguchi's initial popularity quickly waned, and he fell victim to an assassination attempt on 14 November 1930 when he was shot inside Tokyo Station by Tomeo Sagoya, a member of the Aikokusha ultranationalist secret society. (Nine years earlier another Prime Minister, Hara Takashi, had been assassinated near the same place.) The head of the Aikoku-sha was Seiyūkai politician Ogawa Heikichi. The wounds kept Hamaguchi hospitalized for several months.

The 2nd Hamaguchi administration 

Hamaguchi was reelected to a second term as Prime Minister of Japan in March 1931. However, with his health continuing to deteriorate, he was unable to attend the 59th Session of the Imperial Diet, which opened with Foreign Minister Kijūrō Shidehara as acting Prime Minister. The Seiyūkai immediately attacked the government on the grounds that the Prime Minister was not physically present, and that Shidehara was not even a member of the Minseitō. When Shidehara further created an uproar with a comment concerning Emperor Hirohito's support of the London Naval Treaty, the Seiyūkai refused to participate in budget deliberations until Hamaguchi could attend. Despite his failing health, Hamaguchi was forced to attend the Diet, but resigned a month later to be replaced by Wakatsuki Reijirō. He died on 26 August of the same year, and his grave is at the Aoyama Cemetery in Tokyo.

In 1931 Hamaguchi's cabinet sponsored a bill on women's suffrage. It would have granted women over the age of 25 the right to vote in local elections and stand for office given their husbands' approval. The bill passed the lower house, but it was defeated in the House of Peers in March 1931 by a vote of 184 to 62.

Honours

Grand Cordon of the Order of the Sacred Treasure (July 1926)
Grand Cordon of the Order of the Rising Sun (April 1927)
Grand Cordon of the Order of the Rising Sun with Paulownia Flowers (April 1931)

Notes

References
 Bix, Herbert P. (2000). Hirohito and the Making of Modern Japan. New York: HarperCollins. ; 
 Buruma, Ian. Inventing Japan: 1853–1964. Modern Library. Reprint edition (2004) 
 Hotta, Eri. Japan 1941: Countdown to Infamy. Vintage. Reprint edition (2014) 
 Jansen, Marius B. (2000). The Making of Modern Japan. Cambridge: Harvard University Press. ;  OCLC 44090600
 Metzler, Mark.  Lever of Empire: The International Gold Standard and the Crisis of Liberalism in Prewar Japan. University of California Press (2006)

External links

 

1870 births
1931 deaths
20th-century prime ministers of Japan
Prime Ministers of Japan
Ministers of Finance of Japan
People from Kōchi, Kōchi
Ministers of Home Affairs of Japan
People of Meiji-period Japan
University of Tokyo alumni
Members of the House of Representatives (Empire of Japan)
Kenseikai politicians
Rikken Minseitō politicians
Rikken Dōshikai politicians
Recipients of the Order of the Rising Sun with Paulownia Flowers
Recipients of the Order of the Sacred Treasure, 1st class
Grand Cordons of the Order of the Rising Sun
Assassinated Japanese politicians
People murdered in Tokyo
Politicians from Kōchi Prefecture